Sultan Al-Zahrani (born 19 December 1998) is a Saudi Arabian karateka. He won the silver medal in the men's kumite 75 kg event at the 2021 Asian Karate Championships held in Almaty, Kazakhstan. He won one of the bronze medals in the men's 75 kg event at the 2021 Islamic Solidarity Games held in Konya, Turkey.

He competed in the men's 60 kg event at the 2018 Asian Games held in Jakarta, Indonesia. In 2021, he competed at the World Olympic Qualification Tournament held in Paris, France hoping to qualify for the 2020 Summer Olympics in Tokyo, Japan.

Achievements

References

External links 
 

Living people
1998 births
Place of birth missing (living people)
Saudi Arabian male karateka
Karateka at the 2018 Asian Games
Asian Games competitors for Saudi Arabia
Islamic Solidarity Games medalists in karate
Islamic Solidarity Games competitors for Saudi Arabia
21st-century Saudi Arabian people